Evelio Ramón Cardozo (born 6 February 2001) is an Argentine professional footballer who plays as a winger for Atlanta, on loan from Racing Club.

Club career
Cardozo joined Argentinos Juniors at the age of nine, before departing in January 2016 to Racing Club for a reported fee of $3,000,000. He made the substitutes' bench five times in 2019, including for two Copa Libertadores matches. He did likewise for two Copa de la Liga Profesional games in 2020–21, though would eventually make his debut in that competition on 19 November 2020 against Atlético Tucumán; replacing Fabricio Domínguez for the final moments of a two-goal defeat away from home.

In July 2021, Cardozo was loaned out to Primera Nacional club Atlanta until the end of 2022.

International career
Cardozo represented Argentina's U20s at the Ipiranga Cup in 2018. He also trained with the U17s and U18s, notably featuring for the latter in a friendly against Temperley in September 2019.

Atlanta

Career statistics
.

Notes

References

External links

2001 births
Living people
Footballers from Buenos Aires
Argentine footballers
Argentina youth international footballers
Argentina under-20 international footballers
Association football wingers
Racing Club de Avellaneda footballers
Argentine Primera División players
Primera Nacional players